Bavaria is an unincorporated community in Saline County, Kansas, United States.  As of the 2020 census, the population of the community and nearby areas was 60.  It lies along K-140 and a Union Pacific Railroad line west of Salina.

History
The place was originally known as Hohneck, after Ernst Hohneck, who settled there in 1865.  It was also known as Honek.  Bavaria was laid out by E. F. Drake in 1877 and named after the State of Bavaria in Germany.

The post office in Bavaria was closed in 1986.

Geography
Spring Creek flows through the community.

Demographics

For statistical purposes, the United States Census Bureau has defined Bavaria as a census-designated place (CDP). Also, this community is a part of the Salina micropolitan area.

Education
The community is served by Ell-Saline USD 307 public school district.  Ell-Saline schools are located in Brookville.  The Ell-Saline school mascot is Cardinals.

Bavaria schools were closed through school unification. The Bavaria High School mascot was Tigers.

References

Further reading

External links
 Saline County maps: Current, Historic, KDOT

Unincorporated communities in Saline County, Kansas
Unincorporated communities in Kansas
1865 establishments in Kansas
Populated places established in 1865